Chitta Basu may refer to:

Chitta Basu (politician) (1926–1997), Indian politician
Chitta Basu (director)  (1907–1993), Indian director